Collective mental state is generally a literary or legal term, mostly used in sociology and philosophy (in addition to its singular use in psychiatry and psychology), to refer to the condition of someone's being-state when around others. An assessment of a collective mental state includes a description of thought processes, memory, emotions, mood, cognitive state, and energy levels, including the meta overlay of interactions between individuals.

Overview
A collective mental state is both distinct from and contains other mental states of self-aware individuals. The collective mental state forms the basis for individual reflection, juxtaposed with the collective state, that leads to realizations about emotions, states of being, and individuality. The collective mental state is made of conscious minds and may therefore be a more complex version of something like a stampede, which is itself caused by sentinel animals through imitation. Collective mental states may be simulated through the use of a performer and audience; stand-up comedy desires to have a group of people collectively, simultaneously feel one thing: laughter.

Background
When a mental state is shared by a large proportion of the members of a group or society, it can be called a collective mental state. Gustave Le Bon proposed that mental states are passed by contagion, while Sigmund Freud wrote of war fever in his work Group Psychology and the Analysis of the Ego (1922), a perfect example of the collective mental state. Franz Borkenau wrote of collective madness, while many writers have discussed collective depression. Psychosis can be passed from one individual to another as induced psychosis or folie à deux, but rarely involves more than two people. When the mental state involves a large population, it is more appropriate to use plain English rather than psychiatric or psychological terminology.

Instances of collective mental states
 Church (congregation) with collective states like prayer, worship, hymns, speaking in tongues, etc.
 Sports with collective audience states, like booing; bullfighting, WWE, football, American football (including the collective home viewership of these things)
 Concerts where moshing and collective singing occurs
 Riot
 Carnivalesque
 Racism
 Horror film audience

A positive example of a collective mental state would be at a rave or music festival. People come together through music and may feel content or relaxed, even though they may be surrounded by strangers in a loud, stimulating environment. On the other hand, in a dangerous situation, people can experience high levels of fear and anxiety if they are in a group of people that is panicking. An example of this is when a large group try to get out of a building and the individuals at the front are crushed against the doors by the weight of the people behind them.

A type of angry collective state is often referred to as mob mentality. The members of the group feed off of each other's anger and the collective mental state can become very aggressive, as part of the experience is a reduced sense of responsibility for each individual.

See also

References

 Borkenau, Franz, 1981.  End and Beginning, On the Generations of Cultures and the Origins of the West. (ed. and intro. by Richard Lowenthal).  New York, Columbia University Press.
 Freud, Sigmund, 1955. Beyond the Pleasure Principle, Group Psychology and Other Works. In Standard Edition, XVIII (1920–1922). London: Hogarth.
 Le Bon, Gustave, 1960. (First Published 1895). The Mind of the Crowd. New York: Viking.
 Puri, B.K., Laking, P.J. and Teasaden, I.H., 1996. Textbook of Psychiatry. Edinburgh, London, New York, Philadelphia, Sydney, St Louis, Toronto: Churchill Livingstone.
Scarfuto, Christine M., 2009. The Religious Experience of the Rave

Social sciences
Social epistemology